Tilburg is a city and municipality in the Netherlands, in the southern province of North Brabant. With a population of 222,601 (1 July 2021), it is the second-largest city or municipality in North Brabant after Eindhoven and the seventh-largest in the Netherlands as a whole.

Tilburg University is located in Tilburg, as are Avans University of Applied Sciences and Fontys University of Applied Sciences. Tilburg is known for its ten-day-long funfair, held in July each year. The Monday during the funfair is called "Roze Maandag" (Pink Monday) and is primarily LGBT-oriented.

There are three railway stations within the municipality: Tilburg, Tilburg Universiteit and Tilburg Reeshof. The  "Spoorzone" area around Tilburg Central station, once a Dutch Railways train maintenance yard, has been purchased by the city and is being transformed into an urban zone.

History 

Little is known about the beginnings of Tilburg. The name Tilliburg first appeared in documents dating from AD 709, but after that there was no mention for several centuries. In the later Middle Ages, Tilburg referred to a region rather than a particular town or village; its population was largely in a couple of hamlets, one of which was known as "Eastern Tilburg" (Oost-Tilburg), which was later reflected in the name Oisterwijk ("Eastern Quarter"). This village centred around a small (probably wooden) castle or Motteburcht on an equally small hill, which became derelict and was torn down after a few centuries at most. Of this first "Tilburg Castle", nothing remained c. 2000, except for a few remnants of its moat in the suburbs of Oisterwijk. In the 14th century, Tilburg was proclaimed a manor; together with Goirle, it acquired the title of "The Manor of Tilburg and Goirle".

Successively, the manorial rights fell into the hands of several lords of noble lineage. They derived their income from taxes, fines and interest paid by the villagers.

In the 15th century, one of the lords of Tilburg, Jan van Haestrecht, built Tilburg Castle. "That stone chamber at Hasselt" is mentioned in several historical documents. In 1858, however, the castle was pulled down to make way for a factory, but the name lives on, in the city arms and logo. A replica of the foundations of the castle was restored in ca. 1995 in its original location, after the factory was demolished. In 1803, Goirle was separated from Tilburg and on 18 April 1809, Tilburg was granted city status. In that year, it had about 9,000 inhabitants. In 2009 Tilburg hosted several festivities in celebration of 200 years as a city.

Wool capital of the Netherlands 
Tilburg grew around one of the so-called "herd places" or "Frankish triangles", triangular plots where a number of roads (usually sand roads) met. These herd places were collective pasturelands for flocks of sheep. Their shape is still reflected in the layout of many places in Tilburg. Many districts, including Korvel, Oerle, Broekhoven, Hasselt, Heikant, De Schans, and Heuvel, bear the names of these old hamlets. The poor farmers living in these hamlets soon decided not to sell the wool from their sheep but to weave it themselves, and for a long time, much of the space inside their small houses was occupied by a loom—by the 17th century these numbered about 300. Enterprising people saw their chance. As so-called "drapers" they supplied the weavers with the raw materials for their "home working", and the first Tilburg "mill houses" came into existence. From then on, the wool industry underwent rapid growth, and in 1881 Tilburg had as many as 145 wool mills. Home weaving continued, however, until the early 20th century. Woollen textiles from Tilburg were known far and wide.

After World War II Tilburg retained its place as wool capital of the Netherlands, but in the 1960s the industry collapsed and by the 1980s the number of operating wool mills had declined. Present-day Tilburg industry consists of a wide variety of enterprises. The main economic sector has become transport and logistics with a variety of industry as a close second.

Urban renewal 
When the wool industry collapsed in the 1960s, Cees Becht was the mayor of Tilburg. While he was in office, many old buildings were destroyed, including some precious monuments. The Koningswei neighbourhood (King's Meadows) was demolished and replaced by Koningsplein (King's Square). The reason for demolishing the neighbourhood was to replace slum with modern building. The new development, however, has not been successful and may feel that the square feels abandoned most of the year.
Considered even worse was the demolition of the old city hall. This classicistic-styled building was a national-registered monument, but even that didn't stop Becht's plans to demolish it to build the nine-storey, modern-day, black complex. A part of the empty area was used to build the system of the inner Cityring.
Another building that was demolished was the old railway station, which was replaced due to Hoogspoor (literally: high rails), a project bringing the railway on viaducts to reduce traffic congestion in the years around 1960. The century-old station building was replaced by the modern one.
Because of all of this and some more parts of Tilburg, Cees Becht gained the dubious nickname Cees de Sloper (Cees the demolisher).

Modern history 
In the 1980s, many locations, formerly occupied by wool factories had been filled with small-scale housing projects. This mostly happened when Henk Letschert was mayor of Tilburg.
The Heuvel, one of the important squares, had its own lime tree until 27 April 1994, being chopped for a bicycle parking basement. The felling led to many protests, because the tree was still healthy. After the Pieter Vreedeplein reconstruction, plans were made to plant a descendant of the original lime tree. Three were placed, only one of them survived. The last living tree was moved to another location again, but died shortly after. As of 23 November 2011, no more descendants have been placed. The current one is just another lime tree.
In the 1990s Tilburg developed a modern skyline. Because of new policy three buildings were built, which are considered skyscrapers in the Netherlands. These are the Interpolis headquarters, the Westpoint Tower and StadsHeer. The 'StadsHeer' is the third one and is part of the 'Haestrechtkwartier' (Haestrecht quarter). The residential tower is nicknamed De Vogelkooikes (The Bird Cages) for its cubic balconies taped onto the building.

King William II 
King William II (1792–1849) was fond of Tilburg. "Here I can breathe freely and I feel happy", he once said about the town. King William II always supported Tilburg—he provided money to improve the sheep breeding, built new farms and founded a cavalry barracks on St. Joseph Street, now a monumental building of the City Archives. Although the King was always made welcome by the manufacturers he had befriended, he needed his own residence in Tilburg, and commissioned the construction of a palace, which would function as his country residence. Construction started in 1847 and was completed just days before William II died, in 1849. It is now part of Tilburg City Hall. In 1987 an obelisk was erected nearby, in memory of King William II. It replaced the old "needle" dating from 1874, which was removed from the street in 1968. After its restoration, William II's statue has got a place again in the heart of the city, where he felt happy among its inhabitants. The local football club Willem II Tilburg was named after the king.

Topography

Tilburg Centrum 

Tilburg Centrum is the downtown of Tilburg, and is situated between (clockwise) the Spoorlaan, Heuvelring, Paleisring, Schouwburgring and Noordhoekring, which is the same as the order of the one-way roads around the district. The district has 6,572 inhabitants, and most of the shops, hotels, restaurants and cafes of the city. In 2008, the refurbished Pieter Vreedeplein was opened to the public, addressing a lack of shopping facilities as compared to similar-sized cities in the Netherlands. Two smaller cinemas were replaced by a bigger one on the Pieter Vreedeplein in 2007. Despite being called Centrum, the district is some distance southeast of the geographical center. The district is connected by the Tilburg railway station.

Oud-Noord 

Oud-Noord is situated north of the railway that crosses Tilburg, and between the Ringbanen (ring roads around the city center). The district has 33,915 inhabitants. Contemporary arts museum De Pont is located within the district. When the railway marshalling yard belonging to the Nederlandse Spoorwegen became obsolete, a considerable stretch of the railway across the city, the Spoorzone, became an urban renewal project. New premises for two courses run by Fontys University of Applied Sciences will be located here, as will Tilburg's new central library, replacing the library in Koningsplein. The railway yard is the largest area, though more areas along the railway will be reconstructed.

Oud-Zuid 

Oud-Zuid is a district south, and also west and east of downtown Tilburg. The district has 38,659 inhabitants. The Hart van Brabantlaan is almost surrounded by high buildings like Westpoint Tower and the StadsHeer as a small part of the urban renewal. This area along the railway is partly located in Oud-Zuid. Many important locations in Tilburg are located within the district, just out of the center, such as 013 music venue and the Schouwburg built in 1961. Also the Koningsplein with the main library and the Piushaven are located within the district. Old herd places include Korvel, Broekhoven and Oerle.

Noord 

Tilburg-Noord is located north of the Wilhelmina Canal. The district has 23,340 inhabitants. Tilburg-Noord was built in the period 1966–1974. Therefore, it has many apartment buildings up to 16 floors, drive-in houses, green strips and industrial development. The streets in this district are mostly named after musicians from the Renaissance up to pop artists from the 1960s. The main shopping center is Wagnerplein, while there's also the Verdiplein in Stokhasselt. The one at the Tartinistraat became defunct. Before the district was built, it was mainly an agricultural area attached to a few villages, including Heikant, which is still the name of the biggest neighbourhood. Heikant's former village square, including the old church, is still present. The northernmost part of the district is still agricultural with some forests. In this agricultural area, the blessed Peter Donders was born; there still stands a chapel and a procession park.

Oost 

Tilburg-oost consists of primarily industrial development. Residential neighbourhoods are in a small strip east of the Ringbaan Oost rather than the whole district, however, it is not considered as a part of the city center. The district only has 748 inhabitants.

Zuid 

Tilburg-Zuid is located between the A58 motorway and the Ringbaan Zuid, and is the southernmost district. Tilburg-zuid has 19,149 inhabitants. The district contains two neighbourhoods and many businesses. The football club Willem II is located within the district, as well as the ice-skating rink with a speed skating rink, the Ireen Wüst IJsbaan, which is located here. The main campus of Fontys University of Applied Sciences is located in this district, as well as St. Elisabeth hospital and Leijpark, one of the largest public parks in the city.

West 

Tilburg-west was mostly built after WWII, and has 26,655 inhabitants. The district with its neighbourhoods consists mostly of small brick houses and apartment buildings, except for Zorgvlied, which contains more expensive, free-standing houses. The Westermarkt is the largest shopping center out of the inner city. Many higher educational buildings are standing here, like Tilburg University and Avans Hogeschool. Another place of many schools is along the Reitse Hoevenstraat with multiple secondary schools such as: Jozefmavo and Theresialyceum. The district is connected by train with the Tilburg Universiteit railway station, Previously known as "Tilburg West station" and has one of the two hospitals in Tilburg. The largest mosque of Tilburg, the Turkish Süleymaniye-Mosque built in 2001, stands in the southeastern corner of the district. West is surrounded by forests like Wandelbos and the Oude Warande, located west of the university.

Reeshof 

The Reeshof is the westernmost district and the most recent expansion of the city of Tilburg proper. and has a population of 42,994 inhabitants. Because of this, the Reeshof became the largest district of Tilburg by population. The first houses were completed in 1980, in the neighbourhood Gesworen Hoek. , the last neighbourhood (Koolhoven Buiten) is under construction. The district is connected by the Tilburg Reeshof railway station and multiple roads that encircle the district plus the industrial development Vossenberg north of the Wilhelmina Canal.
The Donge runs through the district, including greenspace with some Highland cattle grazing between the fences protecting the surrounding neighbourhoods. This small-scale nature project is called the Dongevallei, which literally means Donge Valley in English.

Villages of Berkel-Enschot, Biezenmortel, and Udenhout

Demographics

Ethnic makeup  
The population of Tilburg was 222,601 on 1 July 2021. According to the Tilburg city council, the city will reach a population of 217,000 by 2025. Of these, 23.3% (47,964 people) are of foreign descent. People are classified as being of foreign descent when they were born outside of the Netherlands, or when at least one of their parents was born outside of the Netherlands.

Inhabitants by origin

Religion and life stances

The Tilburg agglomeration has the following religious makeup as of 2003:
Roman Catholic (60.7%)
Atheism (21.7%)
Dutch Reformed (7.8%)
Islam (4.8%)
Reformed (4.4%)

Geography

Climate
Tilburg experiences an oceanic climate (Köppen climate classification Cfb) similar to almost all of the Netherlands. Thunderstorms occur in Western Brabant more often than anywhere else in the Netherlands, up to 31 days a year.

Economy
The economy was concentrated on wool industry for centuries, however, since the 1960s, Tilburg has made more progress in having different kinds of industries, supported by the government to save the city from poverty after the decline of wool industry. Chemical company IFF has a factory in Tilburg. In the 1980s, the Japanese company Fujifilm came to Tilburg. Insurance companies like Interpolis and CZ are headquartered in Tilburg, as well. Iris Ohyama has its European offices in Tilburg. Since 2013, the electric car-producing company Tesla operates their main EU facility for assembly and distribution in Europe in the industrial area of Vossenberg north of the suburb "De Reeshof" in Tilburg.

Tilburg has a high concentration of transportation/distribution industries, specializing in value added logistics and services, due to being the geographical center of the Benelux countries and being located on the transport corridor between Antwerp / Rotterdam and the Ruhr area. The 'Waalwijk-Tilburg' region has been in the logistics hotspots top 3 within the Netherlands for years now and finished third in 2017.

Education

Tilburg University

Higher education is of significant importance, with Tilburg University attracting scholars from all over the world. It has a student population of about 13,000 students, about 8 per cent of whom are international students. With well-facilitated Library, museums and city center with many pubs and cafes, this percentage has steadily increased over the past years. TiU offers both Dutch-taught and English-taught programmes. Tilburg is one of the best cities for exchange students to have great experience in the Netherlands. It is a perfect city for students to work, mingle, get to know each other and make friends.

The institution has gained a reputation in both research and education. In the field of economics, the Faculty of Economics and Business Administration ranked No. 1 in Europe for the second consecutive time in 2007 according to the Journal of the European Economic Association with regard to publications in top journals.
In 2007 the Executive MBA program at the university's TiasNimbas Business School ranked # 11 in the world according to the Financial Times. In the field of law, Tilburg University was ranked No. 1 in the Netherlands for the last three years according to Elsevier magazine.

Fontys School of Fine and Performing Arts

Tilburg is also the location of the Fontys School of Fine and Performing Arts (Dutch: Fontys Hogeschool voor de Kunsten - FHK), part of the Fontys Hogescholen. The School originated from the merging of various educational institutions that had existed in different capacity in Tilburg before being united under the Fontys group, such as the Brabants Conservatorium, one of the nine conservatoires in the Netherlands, and the Academie voor Beeldende Vorming.

Fontys School of Arts offers various bachelor and master programmes in English and in Dutch, across different fields in music, visual arts, dance, theatre and performing arts

This institution is based in a building known as 'Kunstkluster', located in the centre of the city next to the Schouwburg and incorporating a Concert Hall.

Culture and recreation
Tilburg is a pilot city of the Council of Europe and the EU Intercultural Cities programme.

Beverages
Schrobbelèr is a local liqueur. It has an alcoholic percentage of 21.5%, slightly lower than most bitters and has a relatively sweet flavour. The drink is sold in a stone jar and is drunk cold from own glass, a high and tiny chalice glass, larger than a Jägermeister glass.
The drink originated in 1973 when Tilburgian entrepreneur Jan Wassing started experimenting with a drink with lower alcoholic percentage that was appropriate for his stomach. The result was successful. The drink is distilled now at Loven industrial area in Tilburg by the Eindhoven company Schrobbeler Ltd, without the è on the last vowel. The drink is especially consumed at Carnival. The name is derived from the profession of 'Schrobbelaar', in the textile industry in Tilburg. The profession was unskilled and had a low wage.

Another known drink from Tilburg is Peerke's Nat, which has a higher alcoholic percentage than Schrobbelèr (25%) and was introduced at the beatification of Peter Donders (locally named Peerke). The drink is sold in bottles of 70 centiliters.

The Koningshoeven Brewery brews trappist beer. It was founded in 1884 at Koningshoeven Abbey.

Open air art

Tilburg's open air art is mostly supported by KORT (Kunst in Open Ruimte Tilburg, Dutch for Art in Open Space Tilburg). One example is the turning house on the Hasseltrotonde, a roundabout, was erected in 2008.

Besides being responsible for newer, modern art, KORT also gives information about older works of art, like the Willem II statue on the Heuvel.

Festival city, music
The city of Tilburg hosts many festivals, such as Incubate, Festival Mundial (world culture), Stranger Than Paranoia (jazz), Tilburg Students Festival, and Roadburn Festival. 013 is a modern pop-centre. Paradox is a club for experimental jazz and improvised music. Fontys University of Applied Sciences started a pop academy in the beginning of the 21st century, and students often perform on local stages.

Museums
Tilburg has an outstanding museum of Modern Art, De Pont, which houses works from renowned artists such as Ai Weiwei, Anish Kapoor and Richard Serra. There is also a large textile museum, offering not only a historical view in its former factory, but also a laboratory for design, production and development of textile as a material.

The Textile Museum: A Museum in a restored factory with striking glass entrance, for industrial & designer textiles. Tilburg has traditionally had a rich textile industry. The traces of this form of industry can be found in various places in the city.

De Pont, The museum of Modern Art located in Tilburg. De Pont houses works from renowned artists such as Ai Weiwei, Anish Kapoor and Richard Serra. The museum is housed in a former wool mill, an important piece of Tilburg's history. The artwork 'Skymirror' is displayed on the square in front of the museum. A work by Anish Kapoor.

Nature Museum Brabant: The Museum is dedicated to natural history. The museum was housed in the former intendant residence of King Willem II.
The collection of Natuurmuseum Brabant consists of stuffed animals of all shapes and sizes, animals "on strong water", dried plants, stones, minerals, fossils and archaeological objects.

Museum Scryption: This was a former museum in Tilburg with the main theme 'written communication'.

SEA Foundation Tilburg: an internationally oriented art foundation, exhibition space and artist residence for artists, writers and curators.

Citymuseum Tilburg
The collection that Stadsmuseum Tilburg manages falls into the Tilburg City Collection. In addition, it manages the Memory of Tilburg with more than 4400 stories.

The tilburg city museum does not have a fixed location, but operates, among other things, in the Peerke Donders Pavilion and Vincent's Drawing Room.
Vincent's drawing room: In Vincent's Drawing Room you will find a museum room where the authentic room of Vincent van Gogh has been recreated and a modern drawing room with drawing computers. Vincent van Gogh lived and studied several years in Tilburg. The house where he lived can't be visited. The square where the house is located has been redesigned in the Van Gogh style.
Peerke Donders Pavilion: A museum for charity, in honor of Petrus Donders.

Parks and forests
A lot of parks and forests provide people from the Tilburg area with recreation. Leijpark and Reeshofpark are the largest among the parks in Tilburg. Leijpark was famous for Festival Mundial and lies next to St. Elisabeth hospital and a monastery, the Cenakel. Reeshofpark was created in the late 1990s, including some restaurants opened in 2011. Some older parks include Wilhelminapark in Oud-Noord, are built on the square of the former herd place Veldhoven. Tilburg offers, in comparison to other top-ten cities in the Netherlands, the most forest area. In the municipality, Tilburg has the Wandelbos, a forest south of the similarly named neighbourhood in Tilburg-West, the Oude Warande, the Kaaistoep, a forest of 4.5 km2, and partially, Huis Ter Heide in the northwest of Tilburg, a 6.5 km2-sized natural redevelopment area. Out of the municipality, there's a national park called Loonse en Drunense Duinen which includes dunes of drift sand from the west coast.

Sports

The local football team is Willem II, named in remembrance of King William II.

Tilburg Ten Miles is an annual road running competition held in Tilburg.

Students' sports like rowing and hockey are popular as well. Tilburg hosts three field hockey clubs that play in top national leagues.

Tilburg has an ice skating rink, including the 400 m speed skating rink Ireen Wüst IJsbaan. Within the speed skating rink there's an ice hockey field. The hockey team Tilburg Trappers dominated the Eredivisie (Dutch Premier League) for years before moving to the Oberliga, the third tier of ice hockey in Germany.

Transport

Tilburg has three railway stations: Tilburg (Centraal), Tilburg Universiteit and Tilburg Reeshof. The latter was built to connect the then-latest district of Tilburg, the Reeshof. Intercity trains only stop at Tilburg (centraal). The name of Tilburg Universiteit Station was Tilburg West from its construction in 1968 to December 2010, however, after 40 years, it was not the westernmost station anymore. A fourth railway station is planned for Berkel-Enschot, also in the municipality of Tilburg and getting more absorbed into Tilburg. In the past, until 1938, Berkel-Enschot had its own train station. Udenhout, lying further northeast in the municipality, also had its train station until 1938. Both stations are on the line to 's-Hertogenbosch.

The Tilburg city and local buses are operated by Veolia Transport Nederland. The city experimented from 2005 to 2008 with free public transport for children and 55+ people. Before Veolia took over the bus network, it was operated by BBA (abbreviation for Brabants(ch)e Buurtspoorwegen en Autobussen). It has since been transferred to Arriva.

Tilburg has an extensive bicycle path network called Sternet-Routes. The first bicycle path of this network was built between the city center and the university in 1975. From the mid-1990s, multiple bicycle paths (rather than lanes along the road) have been built. Since most of these have been paved by tiles, there is an increasing call for asphalt-paved paths. For this network of bicycle paths, some new tunnels were built under the railway that crosses the city.

Tilburg is, at variance from other Dutch cities of a similar size, connected by only one national motorway, the A58 / E312 (to Breda and Eindhoven). An outer beltway, consisting of two provincial 2x2-roads and the A58, was finished in May 2012. Although the outer beltway is fully navigable, the Burgemeester Bechtweg, which was built initially as a two-lane (one per direction) road, was finished in 2013. Two other routes are of considerable importance for Tilburg: the A261/N261 to Waalwijk and the A65/N65 to 's-Hertogenbosch. Neither is a complete motorway, and both experience bottlenecks. Various plans exist to build both to higher standards, with the N261 improved in 2015.

Twin towns – sister cities

Tilburg is twinned with:
 Changzhou, China
 Lublin, Poland
 Matagalpa, Nicaragua
 Minamiashigara, Japan
 Same, Tanzania

Notable people from Tilburg

The Arts 

 brothers Gerard van Spaendonck (1746–1822) & Cornelis van Spaendonck (1756–1839) Dutch painters
 brother & sister Joseph August Knip (1777–1847) & Henriëtte Geertruida Knip (1783–1842) painters
 Vincent van Gogh (1853–1890) attended the King Willem II school, where he was taught painting
 Ludolph Berkemeier (1864-1930) a Dutch landscape and cityscape painter
 Sir Bernardus Weber (1912-1996) a Dutch sculptor, draughtsman, and pastellist
 Theo l' Herminez (1921–1997) a Dutch painter, moved from impressionism to realism
 Frans de Kok (1924–2011) a Dutch musician, conducted the winning Dutch entry to the 1969 Eurovision Song Contest
 Theo van de Sande (born 1947) cinematographer
 Ruud Janssen (born 1959) a Dutch fluxus and mail artist
 Leonard Retel Helmrich (born 1959) a Dutch cinematographer and film director
 Arjen Anthony Lucassen (born 1960) a Dutch singer, songwriter with Ayreon and Star One
 Marc-Marie Huijbregts (born 1964) a Dutch comedian, actor and TV presenter
 Richard Rijnvos (born 1964) a Dutch composer
 Guus Meeuwis (born 1972) a Dutch singer-songwriter, attended Tilburg University
 Ruud Jolie (born 1976) the lead guitarist of the symphonic metal band Within Temptation
 Tarik Azzougarh (born 1979) stage name Cilvaringz, rapper affiliated with Wu-Tang Clan
 Joris Oprins (born 1980) an animation director
 Floor Jansen (born 1981) a Dutch singer and songwriter with symphonic metal band Nightwish
 Daan Janzing (born 1981) producer and guitarist with the Dark rock band My Favorite Scar.

Public thinking & Public Service 

 Bl. Peerke Donders (1807–1887), Roman Catholic missionary, cared for the lepers of Batavia, Suriname; beatified in 1982
 dom Franciscus Janssens (1881–1950) the 76th General Abbot of the Common Observance
 Carl Romme (1896–1980) a Dutch politician and jurist
 Norbert Schmelzer (1921–2008) a Dutch politician, diplomat, economist and Minister
 Ernst Hirsch Ballin (born 1950) a retired Dutch politician and jurist, lives in Tilburg. 
 Henk Krol (born 1950) a Dutch journalist, publisher, entrepreneur and politician 
 Yvonne van Rooy (born 1951) a retired Dutch politician, MEP, diplomat and businesswoman
 Roger van Boxtel (born 1954) a retired Dutch politician, now CEO of Dutch Railways

Science & Business 

 Franciscus Donders (1818–1889), a Dutch ophthalmologist
 Eduard Jan Dijksterhuis (1892-1965), a Dutch historian of science
 Bart le Blanc (born 1946), a Dutch economist in public finance, banking and asset management
 Henri Termeer (1946–2017), a Dutch biotechnology executive and entrepreneur 
 Jozien Bensing (born 1950), a Dutch clinical psychologist and academic
 Marc van Roosmalen (born  1947), Dutch Brazilian primatologist (elected as one of the "Heroes of the Planet" by Time magazine in 2000)
 Marijn Dekkers (born 1957), a former pharmaceutical businessman, CEO of Bayer AG 2010 to 2016
 Caroline Nevejan (born 1958), Chief Science Officer with the City of Amsterdam 
 Ron Heeren (born 1965), professor specializing in mass spectrometry imaging
 Michael van Poppel (born 1989), the founder and President of BNO News

Sport 

 Jan Pijnenburg (1906–1979) track cyclist, team silver medallist at the 1928 Summer Olympics
 Toon Becx (1920−2013) a Dutch footballer with 329 caps with Willem II 
 Toon Ebben (1930–2011) a Dutch equestrian, competed at the 1976 Summer Olympics
 Toon van Helfteren (born 1951) a Dutch former basketball player, current coach of Feyenoord Basketball and coach of the Dutch national basketball team 2013 to 2019. 
 Bud Brocken (born 1957) a Dutch former professional footballer with 512 club caps
 Anita Staps (born 1961) a retired judoka, world title holder in 1980
 Jean-Paul van Poppel (born 1962) a former Dutch racing cyclist
 John Lammers (born 1963) a football manager with Esbjerg fB and former player with 433 club caps
 Bas Rutten (born 1965) a Dutch-American actor and retired mixed martial artist
 Ageeth Boomgaardt (born 1972) a Dutch former field hockey defender, 192 international matches for the Netherlands, and team bronze and silver medallist at the Olympic Games
 Remy Bonjasky (born 1976) a Surinamese-Dutch former kickboxer
 Floris Evers (born 1983) a field hockey player, team silver medallist at the 2004 and 2012 Summer Olympics
 Mike van der Zanden (born 1987) a Dutch paraplegic swimmer, bronze medallist in the 2004 and 2008 Summer Paralympics
 Margot van Geffen (born 1989) a field hockey player, team gold and silver medallist at the 2012 and 2016 Summer Olympics 
 Benito van de Pas (born 1993) is a Dutch darts player
 Jackie Groenen (born 1994) a Dutch footballer and former judoka

Gallery

See also

 Textures
 Jewish Tilburg
 Brabantian
Villa Mariënhof

References

External links

 Official website

 
Cities in the Netherlands
Municipalities of North Brabant
Populated places in North Brabant